Moe Win (born 30 March 1988) is a footballer from Myanmar, who currently plays for Nay Pyi Taw F.C. He made his first appearance for the Myanmar national football team in 2006.

International

In 2007, He represent the Myanmar U-23 to The Final of 2007 SEA Games. But Crused Thailad U-23. 
 so Myanmar only get Silver Medal.

References 

1988 births
Living people
Burmese footballers
Myanmar international footballers
Kanbawza F.C. players
Ayeyawady United F.C. players
Association football defenders
Southeast Asian Games silver medalists for Myanmar
Southeast Asian Games bronze medalists for Myanmar
Southeast Asian Games medalists in football
Competitors at the 2007 Southeast Asian Games